The North West Province, also known as North Western Province, covers the northwest part of the West African state of Sierra Leone. It is one of the five administrative regions of Sierra Leone. The province was created in 2017 from the Northern Province. The three districts of Kambia,  Karene and Port Loko make up the  North Western Province of Sierra Leone. The province has a total of 34 Chiefdoms and a population of 1,162,065 inhabitants (as of 2017). The administrative capital of the North West province is Port Loko.

Borders
The North Western Province has the following borders:
Kindia Region, Guinea: north
Mamou Region, Guinea: north
North Province: east
Western Area: southwest
Southern Province: south.

Economic activities 
The main economic activities in the North West province is farming, livestock, fishing and natural resources, including  rutile, gold, aluminium, bauxite and diamond.

The Temne people is by far the largest single ethnic group in the North West, especially in Port Loko and Karine Districts where the Temne is a large majority. The Temne also form the single largest ethnic group, though short of majority, in  Kambia District in the North West. Kambia District is more ethnically diverse and home to a significant ethnic minorities population. About 87% of the population of the North Western Province is Muslim; and about 12% Christian.

References
https://www.theeastafrican.co.ke/news/africa/Sierra-Leone-unveils-new-geographical-map/4552902-4518918-xaplcq/index.html

 
Provinces of Sierra Leone